Pedro Heilbron (born March 5, 1958, in Colón, Panama) is the CEO of Copa Holdings S.A., the parent company of Panamanian carrier Copa Airlines and Colombian carrier AeroRepública.

Early life and education 
Heilbron received a B.A. in economics from Holy Cross, Massachusetts in 1979, and an MBA from George Washington University.

Career

Copa Airlines 
Heilbron joined Copa Airlines as CEO in 1988. Under his leadership, Copa expanded and transformed from a regional player into one of the three large air groups in Latin America, increasing the fleet from two (1988) to 98 aircraft (2014) and annual revenues growing from $20 million to $3 billion in the same time period. The company joined the Star Alliance in 2012.

In December 2016, Heilbron was elected as chairman of the Star Alliance Chief Executive Board (CEB), succeeding former chairman Calin Rovinescu.

Additional affiliations 
Pedro Heilbron is also a member of the board of governors of IATA, past president and current vice-president of the Latin American Airline Association (ALTA).

Awards and recognition 
In 2006, Heilbron received the Bravo Award as CEO of the Year by Latin Trade Magazine and was named Executive of the Year by the Panamanian Association of Corporate Executive (APEDE) two years later. In 2009, he was awarded the Airline Business Lifetime Achievement Award by Airline Business.

In 2014, Heilbron was recognized with the Tony Jannus award by the Tony Jannus Disdinguished Aviation Society, (which was formed by the Tampa and St. Petersburg chambers of commerce).

References

External links
Copaair.com

Living people
People from Colón, Panama
1958 births
Panamanian chief executives
George Washington University School of Business alumni
College of the Holy Cross alumni